Chris Thomasson is a game designer who has worked primarily on role-playing games.

Career
Chris Thomasson was Paizo Publishing's editor for Dungeon magazine when he announced "The Shackled City Adventure Path" in 2003.

His D&D design work includes the third edition Fiend Folio (2003), Monster Manual III (2004), Dungeon Master's Guide II (2005), Magic of Eberron (2005), Complete Psionic (2006), and Complete Champion (2007).

References

External links
 

American game designers
Dungeons & Dragons game designers
Living people
Place of birth missing (living people)
Year of birth missing (living people)